This is a list of the first minority male lawyer(s) and judge(s) in Minnesota. It includes the year in which the men were admitted to practice law (in parentheses). Also included are men who achieved other distinctions such becoming the first in their state to graduate from law school or become a political figure.

Firsts in state history

Lawyer 

 Fredrick McGhee (1889): First African American male lawyer in Minnesota

State judges 

 L. Howard Bennett: First African American male judge in Minnesota (1957)
 Stephen L. Maxwell (1953): First African American male to serve as a district court judge in Minnesota (1968)
Alberto Miera: First Hispanic American male judge in Minnesota (c. 1980s)
Alan Page (1978): First African American male to serve on the Minnesota Supreme Court (1993)
Tony N. Leung: First Asian American male judge in Minnesota (1994)
 Robert A. Blaeser (1979): First Native American (Anishinaabe from the White Earth Band of Ojibwe) male judge in Minnesota (1995)

 David Stras: First Jewish American male to serve on the Minnesota Supreme Court (2010)
 Peter Reyes Jr. (1997): First Hispanic American male to serve on the Minnesota Court of Appeals (2014)
 David Stras: First Jewish American male to serve on the Minnesota Supreme Court (2010)
 Leonardo Castro: First Hispanic American male to serve as a chief judge in a judicial district in Minnesota (2020)

Federal judges 
Michael J. Davis (1972): First African American male appointed as a Judge of the U.S. District Court for the District of Minnesota (1994) and its Chief Judge (2008)
Leo Brisbois: First Native American male to serve as a U.S. Magistrate judge in Minnesota (2010)
Tony N. Leung: First Asian American male to become a federal court judge in Minnesota (2011)

Attorney General  

 Keith Ellison (1990): First African American (and first Muslim) to become Attorney General of Minnesota (2018)

United States Attorney 

 B. Todd Jones: First African American male to serve as the United States Attorney for the District of Minnesota (2009)

Assistant United States Attorney 

 Donald M. Lewis: First African American male to serve as an Assistant U.S. Attorney for the District of Minnesota (1982-1988)

County Attorney 

 John C. Choi (1995): First Korean American male to serve as a County Attorney in Minnesota (2011)

Public Defender 

 Daniel Lew: First Asian American male to serve as a Chief Public Defender in Minnesota (2014)

Political Office 

Keith Ellison (1990): First African American male (and first Muslim) elected to the U.S. Congress from Minnesota (2006)

Bar Association 

 Jarvis Jones: First African American to serve as the President of the Minnesota State Bar Association (c. 2001)
Leo Brisbois: First male of American Indian descent to serve as the President of the Minnesota State Bar Association (2009)
Phil Duran: First openly LGBT male to serve as the President of the Minnesota State Bar Association (2013)

Firsts in local history 
 John Francis Wheaton: First African American male to graduate from the University of Minnesota Law School (1897) [Hennepin and Ramsey Counties, Minnesota]

 James Cunningham: First African American male judge in Anoka County, Minnesota (2009)

 Joseph Carter: First African American male judge in Dakota County, Minnesota (2001)

 William R. Morris (c. 1889): First African American male lawyer in Minneapolis, Minnesota [Hennepin County, Minnesota]
 Esteban Rivera: First Latino American male to serve as the President of the Hennepin County Bar Association 

 Leonardo Castro: First Hispanic American male to serve as a Chief Judge of the Second Judicial District (2020) [Ramsey County, Minnesota]

 Shawn L. Pearson: First African American male judge in the Sixth Judicial District in Duluth, Minnesota (St. Louis County, Minnesota; 2021)

See also 

 List of first minority male lawyers and judges in the United States

Other topics of interest 

 List of first women lawyers and judges in the United States
 List of first women lawyers and judges in Minnesota

References 

 
Minority, Minnesota, first
Minority, Minnesota, first
Legal history of Minnesota
Lists of people from Minnesota
Minnesota lawyers